Church of St. Dismas, the Good Thief is a historic Roman Catholic church at the Clinton Correctional Facility on Cook Street in Dannemora, New York.

Description
St. Dismas Church was built between 1939 and 1941 and is a large Neogothic inspired stone chapel. It was constructed of fieldstones salvaged from several 19th century stone structures already on the site, including the prison's first cell block. It features a steeply pitched, slate-clad gable roof and two massive oak entrance doors with Medieval inspired metal strapwork. A , engaged tower with corner buttresses and an octagonal spire is located at the rear corner.

It was added to the National Register of Historic Places in 1991.

References

External links
Church of the Good Thief -- short documentary

Roman Catholic churches in New York (state)
Churches on the National Register of Historic Places in New York (state)
Roman Catholic churches completed in 1941
Churches in Clinton County, New York
National Register of Historic Places in Clinton County, New York
Roman Catholic parishes in the Diocese of Ogdensburg
20th-century Roman Catholic church buildings in the United States